Karney is an Irish surname. Notable people with the surname include:

 Andrew Karney, British electrical engineer, businessman and company director
 Arthur Karney (1864—1963), British bishop
 Benjamin Karney (born 1986), American professor and behavioral scientist
 Jack Karney (1895–1986), Australian rules football player
 Mike Karney (born 1981), American former football player
 Pat Karney, British Labour Party politician
 Robyn Karney (1940—2017), South African film writer and critic
 Shari Karney (born 1952), American attorney, incest-survivor activist, and bar exam test preparation company owner

See also
 Karney (comics), an American horror comic book mini-series
 Carney (disambiguation)
 McCarney